Asterix was a small tug/mooring launch which capsized and was a total loss in March 2015 while operating at the marine terminal of Fawley Refinery in Southampton Water, England

Description and service
Asterix was a small tug, used for towing and mooring at ExxonMobil's Fawley oil refinery in Hampshire, England. She was a standard "StanTug 1205" built in 2013 by Damen Group of Gorinchem, Netherlands and one of a pair of tugs they delivered to Fawley in 2014.

The tug measured 25 gross tons and was 13.08 metres in length, 5.28 metres beam and with a service draught of 1.85 metres. Her twin engines totalled 442 kW giving a towing power of 9 tons bollard pull. Asterix was normally operated by a crew of two and was in service with Solent Towage Ltd, a UK subsidiary of Norwegian shipowner Østensjø Rederi AS of Haugesund.

Capsizing and loss
On the evening of 30 March 2015, while assisting the Luxembourg-registered oil tanker Donizetti to sail from Fawley, Asterix was "girted" and capsized, later sinking. One crew-member was thrown clear and quickly rescued, despite high winds, but the other was trapped in the partially flooded wheelhouse for more than one hour. He was subsequently seen when the tug briefly rolled upright and only then rescued by breaking a wheelhouse window. The successful raising of Asterix was announced on 12 April 2015, though she was subsequently declared a total loss.

See also
List of shipwrecks in 2015

Notes

References

Tugboats of the United Kingdom
2014 ships
Ships built in the Netherlands
Maritime incidents in 2015
Maritime incidents in England
2015 in England
History of Southampton
2015 disasters in the United Kingdom